The Bureau for the Repression of Communist Activities (Buró para Represión de las Actividades Comunistas, or BRAC) was the Cuban secret police agency that President Fulgencio Batista maintained in the 1950s, which gained a reputation for brutality in its fight against the 26th of July Movement.

The bureau was headed by Mariano Faget, who had first gained fame as a Nazi hunter during Batista's first turn at power, from 1940 to 1944, when he was chief of the Office of Investigation of Enemy Activities (Oficina de Investigación de Actividades Enemigas), a counter-espionage unit that targeted Nazi and Fascist agents.

On Dec. 7, 1955, BRAC agents fired upon an anti-Batista demonstration held by the Federation of University of Students in Havana. Several demonstrators, including Camilo Cienfuegos, were wounded when the police opened fire on the crowd.

The development of BRAC was aided and encouraged by the CIA starting in 1956.

Notes

References

Anti-communist organizations
Cuban Revolution
Defunct intelligence agencies
Law enforcement agencies of Cuba
Political repression in Cuba
Secret police